Abinandhan Ramanujam is an Indian cinematographer, who hails from Chennai, Tamil Nadu. He works primarily in Malayalam and Tamil films.

Early life 
Abinandhan Ramanujam was born in Chennai. He was graduated from L.V. Prasad Film and TV Academy and is a gold medalist from there. He later did a course in visual communication from Dr G R Damodaran College of Science, Coimbatore . Since childhood Abinandhan was interested in photography. His father Ramanujam was a bank officer, who always encouraged him in his work. His father owned an old Yashica camera; he would practice his photography skills, and his father would monitor it as well give guidance on his photography. In school and college days, Abinandhan was very active and had participated in many filmmaking competitions. He used to keep himself busy with some or the other work which was related to filming.

Career 
The Postman is one of such film by Abinandhan which gained National award in best non-feature film category in 2009. Abinandhan got his first break from Bejoy Nambiar. Nambiar was shooting for his MTV series Rush when Akshay, a friend of him who was assisting Nambiar spoke about Abinandhan. He was then called with his camera to Mumbai to be the DOP of the series. At this time, he had developed good contacts within the industry. It was during this period when Lijo Jose Pellissery who had even directed two episodes of the MTV series called up Abinandhan to be the DOP of the super-hit movie Amen. His movie Double Barrel is known for its extraordinary shots. Besides filming, Abinandhan likes traveling. His collaborations with Lijo Jose Pellissery and Prithviraj Sukumaran are highly acclaimed in Malayalam cinema.

Filmography

As partial cinematographer

Awards and achievements

Actor in films 

 David, directed by Bejoy Nambiar

Actor in short films 

 Tinder Kadhal (2018), directed by  Pradeep Ranganathan

References

External links
 Abinandhan Ramanujam on imdb

Indian cinematographers
Tamil film cinematographers
Tamil cinema
Tamil people by occupation